Alshehbazia is a monotypic genus of flowering plants belonging to the family Brassicaceae. It only contains one known species, 'Alshehbazia hauthalii' 

It is native to southern Chile and parts of Argentina.

The genus name of Alshehbazia is in honour of Ihsan Ali Al-Shehbaz, Ph.D. (born 1939 in Iraq) is an Iraqi American botanist who works as Adjunct Professor at University of Missouri-St. Louis and Senior Curator at Missouri Botanical Garden.  The Latin specific epithet of hauthalii refers to Horst Hauthal (1913–2002) a former German ambassador.
It was first described and published in Kew Bull. Vol.70 (Issue 4) in 2015.

References

Brassicaceae
Brassicaceae genera
Plants described in 2015
Flora of South Argentina
Flora of Northwest Argentina
Flora of southern Chile